Collected Poems is a spoken-word recording of the Nobel Prize-winning poet Seamus Heaney reading his own work. It was released by RTÉ to mark his 70th birthday, which occurred on 13 April 2009. The fifteen-CD boxed set spans 556 tracks in over twelve hours of oral performance by the poet (some poems span multiple tracks). The entire work was also released on one disc in MP3 format.

All of Heaney's poetry collections are performed except his final one, Human Chain, which was published in the following year. The poems are presented in the chronological order of Heaney's first eleven poetry collections. A 58-page essay about Heaney by Irish poet Peter Sirr is included in a booklet.

Collection summary

 Disc 01: Death of a Naturalist – 1966
 Disc 02: Door into the Dark – 1969
 Disc 03: Wintering Out – 1972
 Disc 04: North – 1975
 Disc 05: Field Work – 1979
 Disc 06: Station Island – 1984 (disc one)
 Disc 07: Station Island – 1984 (disc two)
 Disc 08: The Haw Lantern – 1987
 Disc 09: Seeing Things – 1991 (disc one)
 Disc 10: Seeing Things – 1991 (disc two)
 Disc 11: The Spirit Level – 1996 (disc one)
 Disc 12: The Spirit Level – 1996 (disc two)
 Disc 13: Electric Light – 2001 (disc one)
 Disc 14: Electric Light – 2001 (disc two)
 Disc 15: District and Circle – 2006

Complete track listing

(Track information source)

Disc 1:  Death of a Naturalist – 1966

01. Digging   
02. Death of a Naturalist   
03. The Barn    
04. An Advancement of Learning
05. Blackberry-Picking   
06. Churning Day   
07. The Early Purges   
08. Follower    
09. Ancestral Photograph   
10. Mid-Term Break    
11. Dawn Shoot   
12. At a Potato Digging i   
13. At a Potato Digging ii   
14. At a Potato Digging iii   
15. At a Potato Digging iv   
16. For the Commander of the 'Eliza'   
17. The Diviner    
18. Turkeys Observed   
19. Cow in Calf    
20. Trout    
21. Waterfall   
22. Docker   
23. Poor Women in a City Church   
24. Gravities   
25. Twice Shy   
26. Valediction    
27. Lovers on Aran    
28. Poem   
29. Honeymoon Flight   
30. Scaffolding    
31. Storm on the Island   
32. Synge on Aran   
33. Saint Francis and the Birds   
34. In Small Townlands   
35. The Folk Singers   
36. The Play Way   
37. Personal Helicon   

Disc 2:  Door into the Dark – 1969

01. Night-Piece    
02. Gone   
03. Dream    
04. The Outlaw   
05. The Salmon Fisher to the Salmon   
06. The Forge   
07. Thatcher    
08. The Peninsula   
09. In Gallarus Oratory   
10. Girls Bathing, Galway, 1965   
11. Requiem for the Croppies   
12. Rite of Spring    
13. Undine   
14. The Wife's Tale   
15. Mother   
16. Cana Revisited    
17. Elegy for a Stillborn Child   
18. Victorian Guitar   
19. Night Drive    
20. At Ardboe Point   
21. Relic of Memory   
22. A Lough Neagh Sequence 1. Up the Shore   
23. A Lough Neagh Sequence 2. Beyond Sargasso   
24. A Lough Neagh Sequence 3. Bait   
25. A Lough Neagh Sequence 4. Setting   
26. A Lough Neagh Sequence 5. Lifting   
27. A Lough Neagh Sequence 6. The Return   
28. A Lough Neagh Sequence 7. Vision   
29. The Given Note    
30. Whinlands   
31. The Plantation    
32. Shoreline   
33. Bann Clay   
34. Bogland   

Disc 3:  Wintering Out – 1972

01. For David Hammond and Michael Longley   
02. Fodder   
03. Bog Oak    
04. Anahorish   
05. Servant Boy   
06. The Last Mummer   
07. Land    
08. Gifts of Rain    
09. Toome   
10. Broagh   
11. Oracle   
12. The Backward Look   
13. Traditions    
14. A New Song    
15. The Other Side   
16. The Wool Trade   
17. Linen Town    
18. A Northern Hoard 1. Roots   
19. A Northern Hoard 2. No Man's Land   
20. A Northern Hoard 3. Stump   
21. A Northern Hoard 4. No Sanctuary   
22. A Northern Hoard 5. Tinder   
23. Midnight   
24. The Tollund man   
25. Nerthus    
26. Cairn-maker   
27. Navvy   
28. Veteran's Dream   
29. Augury   
30. Wedding Day   
31. Mother of the Groom    
32. Summer Home   
33. Serenades   
34. Somnambulist   
35. A Winter's Tale   
36. Shore Woman   
37. Maighdean Mara   
38. Limbo   
39. Bye-Child   
40. Good-night    
41. First Calf    
42. May   
43. Fireside   
44. Dawn    
45. Travel   
46. Westering   

Disc 4:  North – 1975

01. Mossbawn: Two Poems in Dedication to Mary Heaney 1. Sunlight   
02. Mossbawn: Two Poems in Dedication to Mary Heaney 2. The Seed   
03. Antaeus   
04. Belderg   
05. Funeral Rites   
06. North   
07. Viking Dublin: Trial Pieces   
08. The Digging Skeleton    
09. Bone Dreams i    
10. Bone Dreams ii   
11. Bone Dreams iii   
12. Bone Dreams iv   
13. Bone Dreams v    
14. Bone Dreams vi   
15. Come to the Bower    
16. Bog Queen    
17. The Grauballe Man   
18. Punishment   
19. Strange Fruit   
20. Kinship i    
21. Kinship ii   
22. Kinship iii   
23. Kinship iv   
24. Kinship v    
25. Kinship vi   
26. Ocean's Love to Ireland   
27. Aisling   
28. Act of Union    
29. The Betrothal of Cavehill   
30. Hercules and Antaeus   
31. The Unacknowledged Legislator's Dream   
32. Whatever You Say Say Nothing i   
33. Whatever You Say Say Nothing ii   
34. Whatever You Say Say Nothing iii   
35. Whatever You Say Say Nothing iv   
36. Freedman   
37. Singing School (Epigraphs)   
38. Singing School 1. The Ministry of Fear   
39. Singing School 2. A Constable Calls   
40. Singing School 3. Orange Drums, Tyrone, 1966   
41. Singing School 4. Summer 1969    
42. Singing School 5. Fosterage   
43. Singing School 6. Exposure   

Disc 5:  Field Work – 1979

01. Oysters    
02. Triptych I After a Killing   
03. Triptych II Sibyl   
04. Triptych III At the Water's Edge   
05. The Toome Road   
06. A Drink of Water    
07. The Strand at Lough Beg   
08. A Postcard from North Antrim   
09. Casualty   
10. The Badgers   
11. The Singer's House   
12. The Guttural Muse   
13. In Memoriam Sean O'Riada   
14. Elegy   
15. Glanmore Sonnets I    
16. Glanmore Sonnets II   
17. Glanmore Sonnets III   
18. Glanmore Sonnets IV   
19. Glanmore Sonnets V    
20. Glanmore Sonnets VI   
21. Glanmore Sonnets VII   
22. Glanmore Sonnets VIII    
23. Glanmore Sonnets IX   
24. Glanmore Sonnets X    
25. September Song   
26. An Afterwards    
27. High Summer   
28. The Otter   
29. The Skunk   
30. Homecomings   
31. A Dream of Jealousy    
32. Polder   
33. Field Work I   
34. Field Work II    
35. Field Work III   
36. Field Work IV    
37. Song    
38. Leavings   
39. The Harvest Bow   
40. In Memoriam Francis Ledwidge   
41. Ugolino    

Disc 6:  Station Island – 1984  (disc one)

PART ONE

01. The Underground   
02. La Toilette   
03. Sloe Gin   
04. Away from it All   
05. Chekhov on Sakhalin   
06. Sandstone Keepsake   
07. Shelf Life 1. Granite Chip   
08. Shelf Life 2. Old Smoothing Iron   
09. Shelf Life 3. Old Pewter   
10. Shelf Life 4. Iron Spike   
11. Shelf Life 5. Stone from Delphi   
12. Shelf Life 6. A Snowshoe   
13. A Migration   
14. Last Look    
15. Remembering Malibu   
16. Making Strange   
17. The Birthplace   
18. Changes   
19. An Ulster Twilight   
20. A Bat on the Road   
21. A Hazel Stick for Catherine Ann   
22. A Kite for Michael and Christopher   
23. The Railway Children   
24. Sweetpea   
25. An Aisling in the Burren   
26. Widgeon   
27. Sheelagh na Gig   
28. The Loaning   
29. The Sandpit 1. 1946   
30. The Sandpit 2. The Demobbed Bricklayer   
31. The Sandpit 3. The Sand Boom   
32. The Sandpit 4. What the Brick Keeps   
33. The King of the Ditchbacks I   
34. The King of the Ditchbacks II   
35. The King of the Ditchbacks III   

Disc 7:  Station Island – 1984  (disc two)

PART TWO - STATION ISLAND

01. Station Island I   
02. Station Island II   
03. Station Island III   
04. Station Island IV   
05. Station Island V   
06. Station Island VI   
07. Station Island VII   
08. Station Island VIII   
09. Station Island IX   
10. Station Island X   
11. Station Island XI   
12. Station Island XII

PART THREE - SWEENEY REDIVIVUS

13. The First Gloss   
14. Sweeney Redivivus   
15. Unwinding   
16. In the Beech   
17. The First Kingdom   
18. The First Flight   
19. Drifting Off   
20. Alerted    
21. The Cleric   
22. The Hermit   
23. The Master   
24. The Scribes   
25. A Waking Dream   
26. In the Chestnut Tree   
27. Sweeney's Returns   
28. Holly   
29. An Artist   
30. The Old Icons   
31. In Illo Tempore   
32. On the Road   

Disc 8:  The Haw Lantern – 1987

01. Alphabets   
02. Terminus    
03. From the Frontier of Writing   
04. The Haw Lantern   
05. The Stone Grinder    
06. A Daylight Art    
07. Parable Island    
08. From the Republic of Conscience   
09. Hailstones   
10. Two Quick Notes   
11. The Stone Verdict    
12. From the Land of the Unspoken   
13. A Ship of Death   
14. The Spoonbait   
15. In Memoriam: Robert Fitzgerald   
16. The Old Team   
17. Clearances: In Memoriam M.K.H.   
18. Clearances 1   
19. Clearances 2   
20. Clearances 3   
21. Clearances 4   
22. Clearances 5   
23. Clearances 6   
24. Clearances 7   
25. Clearances 8   
26. The Milk Factory   
27. The Summer of Lost Rachel   
28. The Wishing Tree   
29. A Postcard from Iceland   
30. A Peacock's Feather   
31. Grotus and Coventina    
32. Holding Course    
33. The Song of the Bullets   
34. Wolfe Tone   
35. A Shooting Script    
36. From the Canton of Expectation   
37. The Mud Vision    
38. The Disappearing Island   
39. The Riddle   

Disc 9:  Seeing Things  – 1991  (disc one)

01. The Golden Bough

PART I

02. The Journey Back   
03. Markings    
04. Three Drawings 1. The Point   
05. Three Drawings 2. The Pulse   
06. Three Drawings 3. A Haul   
07. Casting and Gathering   
08. Man and Boy    
09. Seeing Things I   
10. Seeing Things II   
11. Seeing Things III   
12. The Ash Plant   
13. 1.1.87   
14. An August Night   
15. Field of Vision   
16. The Pitchfork   
17. A Basket of Chestnuts   
18. The Biretta    
19. The Settle Bed   
20. The Schoolbag   
21. Glanmore Revisited 1. Scrabble   
22. Glanmore Revisited 2. The Cot   
23. Glanmore Revisited 3. Scene Shifts   
24. Glanmore Revisited 4. 1973   
25. Glanmore Revisited 5. Lustral Sonnet   
26. Glanmore Revisited 6. Bedside Reading   
27. Glanmore Revisited 7. The Skylight   
28. A Pillowed Head   
29. A Royal Prospect   
30. A Retrospect   
31. The Rescue   
32. Wheels within Wheels   
33. The Sounds of Rain   
34. Fosterling   

Disc 10:  Seeing Things  – 1991  (disc two)

PART II - SQUARINGS

1: Lightenings

01. Lightenings i   
02. Lightenings ii   
03. Lightenings iii   
04. Lightenings iv   
05. Lightenings v   
06. Lightenings vi   
07. Lightenings vii   
08. Lightenings viii   
09. Lightenings ix   
10. Lightenings x   
11. Lightenings xi   
12. Lightenings xii

2: Settings

13. Settings xiii   
14. Settings xiv   
15. Settings xv   
16. Settings xvi   
17. Settings xvii   
18. Settings xviii   
19. Settings xix   
20. Settings xx   
21. Settings xxi   
22. Settings xxii   
23. Settings xxiii   
24. Settings xxiv

3: Crossings

25. Crossings xxv   
26. Crossings xxvi   
27. Crossings xxvii   
28. Crossings xxviii   
29. Crossings xxix   
30. Crossings xxx   
31. Crossings xxxi   
32. Crossings xxxii   
33. Crossings xxxiii   
34. Crossings xxxiv   
35. Crossings xxxv   
36. Crossings xxxvi

4. Squarings

37. Squarings xxxvii   
38. Squarings xxxviii   
39. Squarings xxxix   
40. Squarings xl   
41. Squarings xli   
42. Squarings xlii   
43. Squarings xliii   
44. Squarings xliv   
45. Squarings xlv   
46. Squarings xlvi   
47. Squarings xlvii   
48. Squarings xlviii   
49. The Crossing   

Disc 11:  The Spirit Level – 1996  (disc one)

01. The Rain Stick   
02. To a Dutch Potter in Ireland 1.   
03. To a Dutch Potter in Ireland 2. After Liberation   
04. A Brigid's Girdle   
05. Mint    
06. A Sofa in the Forties   
07. Keeping Going   
08. Two Lorries   
09. Damson   
10. Weighing In   
11. St Kevin and the Blackbird   
12. The Flight Path 1   
13. The Flight Path 2   
14. The Flight Path 3   
15. The Flight Path 4   
16. The Flight Path 5   
17. The Flight Path 6   
18. An Invocation   
19. Mycenae Lookout 1. The Watchman's War   
20. Mycenae Lookout 2. Cassandra   
21. Mycenae Lookout 3. His Dawn Vision   
22. Mycenae Lookout 4. The Nights   
23. Mycenae Lookout 5. The Reverie of Water   

Disc 12:  The Spirit Level – 1996  (disc two)

01. The First Words   
02. The Gravel Walks   
03. Whitby-sur-Moyola   
04. The Thimble   
05. The Butter-Print   
06. Remembered Columns   
07. 'Poet's Chair'   
08. The Swing   
09. The Poplar    
10. Two Stick Drawings (1)   
11. Two Stick Drawings (2)   
12. A Call   
13. The Errand    
14. A Dog Was Crying Tonight in Wicklow Also   
15. M.   
16. An Architect   
17. The Sharping Stone   
18. The Strand    
19. The Walk   
20. At the Wellhead   
21. At Banagher   
22. Tollund    
23. Postscript    

Disc 13:  Electric Light – 2001  (disc one)

I

01. At Toomebridge   
02. Perch   
03. Lupins    
04. Out of the Bag I   
05. Out of the Bag II   
06. Out of the Bag III   
07. Out of the Bag IV   
08. Bann Valley Eclogue   
09. Montana   
10. The Loose Box   
11. Turpin Song   
12. The Border Campaign   
13. Known World   
14. The Little Canticles of Asturias 1   
15. The Little Canticles of Asturias 2   
16. The Little Canticles of Asturias 3   
17. Ballynahinch Lake   
18. The Clothes Shrine   
19. Red, White and Blue 1. Red   
20. Red, White and Blue 2. White   
21. Red, White and Blue 3. Blue   
22. Virgil: Eclogue IX   
23. Glanmore Eclogue   
24. Sonnets from Hellas 1. Into Arcadia   
25. Sonnets from Hellas 2. Conkers   
26. Sonnets from Hellas 3. Pylos   
27. Sonnets from Hellas 4. The Augean Stables   
28. Sonnets from Hellas 5. Castalian Spring   
29. Sonnets from Hellas 6. Desfina   

Disc 14:  Electric Light – 2001  (disc two)

01. The Gaeltacht   
02. The Real Name   
03. The Bookcase    
04. Vitruviana   
05. Ten Glosses 1. The Marching Season   
06. Ten Glosses 2. The Catechism   
07. Ten Glosses 3. The Bridge   
08. Ten Glosses 4. A Suit   
09. Ten Glosses 5. The Party   
10. Ten Glosses 6. W. H. Auden 1907-73   
11. Ten Glosses 7. The Lesson   
12. Ten Glosses 8. Moling's Gloss   
13. Ten Glosses 9. Colly   
14. Ten Glosses 10. A Norman Simile   
15. The Fragment

II

16. On His Work in the English Tongue 1   
17. On His Work in the English Tongue 2   
18. On His Work in the English Tongue 3   
19. On His Work in the English Tongue 4   
20. On His Work in the English Tongue 5   
21. Audenesque   
22. To the Shade of Zbigniew Herbert   
23. "Would They Had Stay'd"   
24. Late in the Day   
25. Arion   
26. Bodies and Souls   
27. Clonmany to Ahascragh   
28. Sruth   
29. Seeing the Sick   
30. Electric Light   

Disc 15:  District and Circle – 2006

01. The Turnip-Snedder   
02. A Shiver   
03. Polish Sleepers   
04. Anahorish 1944   
05. To Mick Joyce in Heaven   
06. The Aerodrome    
07. Anything Can Happen   
08. Helmet   
09. Out of Shot   
10. Rilke: After the Fire   
11. District and Circle (1)   
12. District and Circle (2)   
13. District and Circle (3)   
14. District and Circle (4)   
15. District and Circle (5)   
16. To George Seferis in the Underworld   
17. Wordsworth's Skates   
18. The Harrow-Pin   
19. Poet to Blacksmith   
20. Midnight Anvil   
21. Súgán   
22. Senior Infants 1. The Sally Rod   
23. Senior Infants 2. A Chow   
24. Senior Infants 3. One Christmas Day in the Morning   
25. The Nod    
26. A Clip   
27. Edward Thomas on the Lagans Road   
28. Found Prose 1. The Lagans Road   
29. Found Prose 2. Tall Dames   
30. Found Prose 3. Boarders   
31. The Lift   
32. Nonce Words   
33. Stern   
34. Out of This World 1. "Like everybody else..."   
35. Out of This World 2. Brancardier   
36. Out of This World 3. Saw Music   
37. In Iowa    
38. Höfn    
39. On the Spot   
40. The Tollund Man in Springtime (1)   
41. The Tollund Man in Springtime (2)   
42. The Tollund Man in Springtime (3)   
43. The Tollund Man in Springtime (4)   
44. The Tollund Man in Springtime (5)   
45. The Tollund Man in Springtime (6)   
46. Moyulla    
47. Planting the Alder   
48. Tate's Avenue    
49. A Hagging Match   
50. Fiddleheads   
51. To Pablo Neruda in Tamlaghtduff   
52. Home Help 1. Helping Sarah   
53. Home Help 2. Chairing Mary   
54. Rilke: The Apple Orchard   
55. Quitting Time    
56. Home Fires 1. A Scuttle for Dorothy Wordsworth   
57. Home Fires 2. A Stove Lid for W. H. Auden  
58. The Birch Grove   
59. Cavafy: "The rest I'll speak of to the ones below in Hades"   
60. In a Loaning   
61. The Blackbird of Glanmore

Notes

References

2009 albums
Seamus Heaney albums
Albums by artists from Northern Ireland
Audiobooks by title or series
Poetry collections from Northern Ireland
Poetry by Seamus Heaney
Literature albums by Irish artists
Spoken word albums by Irish artists
2000s spoken word albums